Ziyaaraiffushi as a place name may refer to:
 Ziyaaraiffushi (Kaafu Atoll) (Republic of Maldives)
 Ziyaaraiffushi (Laamu Atoll) (Republic of Maldives)